Stéphane Le Garrec (born 7 April 1969) is a French professional football manager and former player who is the head coach of Championnat National 3 club Pontivy. As a player, he was a goalkeeper, and most notably played for Lorient, where he made over 180 league appearances.

Honours 
Lorient

 Coupe de France: 2001–02
 Coupe de la Ligue runner-up: 2001–02

References 

1969 births
Living people

People from Puteaux
Footballers from Hauts-de-Seine
French people of Breton descent
Footballers from Brittany
French footballers
Association football goalkeepers
Brittany international footballers
FC Lorient players
En Avant Guingamp players
Valenciennes FC players
Stade Rennais F.C. players
Stade Lavallois players
French Division 3 (1971–1993) players
Ligue 2 players
Championnat National players
Ligue 1 players
Championnat National 3 players
Association football goalkeeping coaches
Association football coaches
Association football player-managers
French football managers
FC Lorient non-playing staff
GSI Pontivy managers
Championnat National 3 managers